George Benjamin Hutchinson (6 December 1874 – 22 May 1946) was an Australian rules footballer who played with Fitzroy in the Victorian Football League (VFL).

References

External links

 

Australian rules footballers from Victoria (Australia)
Fitzroy Football Club players
Ballarat Football Club players
1874 births
1946 deaths